Frederic "Fred" Soyez (born 11 February 1978) is a French field hockey coach. He coached the Spanish national team at the 2016 Summer Olympics, where the team finished fifth.

References

External links

1978 births
Living people
French expatriate sportspeople in Spain
Field hockey coaches
French male field hockey players
Sportspeople from Valenciennes
Spanish Olympic coaches